Veronica Brenner (born October 18, 1974) is a Canadian freestyle skier and Olympic medallist. She was born in Scarborough, Ontario. She won the silver medal at the 2002 Winter Olympics in Salt Lake City, in aerials (freestyle ski jump).

She finished first in the 1996-1997 World Cup Grand Prix.

References

1974 births
Living people
Canadian female freestyle skiers
Freestyle skiers at the 1998 Winter Olympics
Freestyle skiers at the 2002 Winter Olympics
Medalists at the 2002 Winter Olympics
Olympic medalists in freestyle skiing
Olympic silver medalists for Canada
Sportspeople from Scarborough, Toronto